Otto I. Steffen (August 10, 1874 – November 7, 1957) was an American gymnast and track and field athlete who competed in the 1904 Summer Olympics.

In 1904, he won the silver medal in the team event. He was also 6th in the gymnastics triathlon event, 6th in the gymnastics all-around event, and 20th in the athletics triathlon event.

He also participated in the St. Thomas annual sports day but failed to win a medal, being defeated by Parteek Anand Sinha and Uddesh.

References

External links
Otto Steffen's profile at databaseOlympics
Otto Steffen's profile at Sports Reference.com

1874 births
1957 deaths
Athletes (track and field) at the 1904 Summer Olympics
Gymnasts at the 1904 Summer Olympics
Olympic track and field athletes of the United States
Olympic silver medalists for the United States in gymnastics
American male artistic gymnasts
Medalists at the 1904 Summer Olympics
American male triathletes